In cognitive psychology, chunking is a process by which individual pieces of an information set are bound together into a meaningful whole. The chunks, by which the information is grouped, are meant to improve short-term retention of the material, thus bypassing the limited capacity of working memory and allowing the working memory to be more efficient.  A chunk is a collection of basic units that have been grouped together and stored in a person's memory. These chunks can be retrieved easily due to their coherent grouping. It is believed that individuals create higher-order cognitive representations of the items within the chunk. The items are more easily remembered as a group than as the individual items themselves. These chunks can be highly subjective because they rely on an individual's perceptions and past experiences, which are linked to the information set. The size of the chunks generally ranges from two to six items but often differs based on language and culture.

According to Johnson (1970), there are four main concepts associated with the memory process of chunking: chunk, memory code, decode and recode. The chunk, as mentioned prior, is a sequence of to-be-remembered information that can be composed of adjacent terms. These items or information sets are to be stored in the same memory code. The process of recording is where one learns the code for a chunk, and decoding is when the code is translated into the information that it represents.

The phenomenon of chunking as a memory mechanism is easily observed in the way individuals group numbers, and information, in day-to-day life. For example, when recalling a number such as 12101946, if numbers are grouped as 12, 10, and 1946, a mnemonic is created for this number as a month, day, and year. It would be stored as December 10, 1946, instead of a string of numbers. Similarly, another illustration of the limited capacity of working memory as suggested by George Miller can be seen from the following example: While recalling a mobile phone number such as 9849523450, we might break this into 98 495 234 50. Thus, instead of remembering 10 separate digits that are beyond the putative "seven plus-or-minus two" memory span, we are remembering four groups of numbers. An entire chunk can also be remembered simply by storing the beginnings of a chunk in the working memory, resulting in the long-term memory recovering the remainder of the chunk.

Modality effect
A modality effect is present in chunking. That is, the mechanism used to convey the list of items to the individual affects how much "chunking" occurs.

Experimentally, it has been found that auditory presentation results in a larger amount of grouping in the responses of individuals than visual presentation does. Previous literature, such as George Miller's The Magical Number Seven, Plus or Minus Two: Some Limits on our Capacity for Processing Information (1956) has shown that the probability of recall of information is greater when the chunking strategy is used. As stated above, the grouping of the responses occurs as individuals place them into categories according to their inter-relatedness based on semantic and perceptual properties. Lindley (1966) showed that since the groups produced have meaning to the participant, this strategy makes it easier for an individual to recall and maintain information in memory during studies and testing. Therefore, when "chunking" is used as a strategy, one can expect a higher proportion of correct recalls.

Memory training systems, mnemonic
Various kinds of memory training systems and mnemonics include training and drills in specially-designed recoding or chunking schemes. Such systems existed before Miller's paper, but there was no convenient term to describe the general strategy and no substantive and reliable research. The term "chunking" is now often used in reference to these systems. As an illustration, patients with Alzheimer's disease typically experience working memory deficits; chunking is an effective method to improve patients' verbal working memory performance. Chunking has been proven to decrease the load on the working memory in many ways. As well as remembering chunked information easier, a person can also recall other non-chunked memories easier due to the benefits chunking has on the working memory.

Channel capacity, "Magic number seven", Increase of short-term memory

The word chunking comes from a famous 1956 paper by George A. Miller, "The Magical Number Seven, Plus or Minus Two: Some Limits on Our Capacity for Processing Information". At a time when information theory was beginning to be applied in psychology, Miller observed that some human cognitive tasks fit the model of a "channel capacity" characterized by a roughly constant capacity in bits, but short-term memory did not. A variety of studies could be summarized by saying that short-term memory had a capacity of about "seven plus-or-minus two" chunks. Miller (1956) wrote, "With binary items, the span is about nine and, although it drops to about five with monosyllabic English words, the difference is far less than the hypothesis of constant information would require (see also, memory span). The span of immediate memory seems to be almost independent of the number of bits per chunk, at least over the range that has been examined to date." Miller acknowledged that "we are not very definite about what constitutes a chunk of information."

Miller (1956) noted that according to this theory, it should be possible to increase short-term memory for low-information-content items effectively by mentally recording them into a smaller number of high-information-content items. He imagined this process is useful in scenarios such as "a man just beginning to learn radio-telegraphic code hears each dit and dah as a separate chunk. Soon he is able to organize these sounds into letters and then he can deal with the letters as chunks. Then the letters organize themselves as words, which are still larger chunks, and he begins to hear whole phrases." Thus, a telegrapher can effectively "remember" several dozen dits and dahs as a single phrase. Naïve subjects can remember a maximum of only nine binary items, but Miller reports a 1954 experiment in which people were trained to listen to a string of binary digits and (in one case) mentally group them into groups of five, recode each group into a name (for example, "twenty-one" for 10101), and remember the names. With sufficient practice, people found it possible to remember as many as forty binary digits. Miller wrote:

Expertise and skilled memory effects
Studies have shown that people have better memories when they are trying to remember items with which they are familiar. Similarly, people tend to create familiar chunks. This familiarity allows one to remember more individual pieces of content, and also more chunks as a whole. One well-known chunking study was conducted by Chase and Ericsson, who worked with an undergraduate student, SF, for over two years. They wanted to see if a person's digit span memory could be improved with practice. SF began the experiment with a normal span of 7 digits. SF was a long-distance runner, and chunking strings of digits into race times increased his digit span. By the end of the experiment, his digit span had grown to 80 numbers. A later description of the research in The Brain-Targeted Teaching Model for 21st Century Schools states that SF later expanded his strategy by incorporating ages and years, but his chunks were always familiar, which allowed him to recall them more easily. It is important to note that a person who does not have knowledge in the expert domain (e.g. being familiar with mile/marathon times) would have difficulty chunking with race times and ultimately be unable to memorize as many numbers using this method.

Chunking in motor learning
Chunking is a method of learning that can be applied in a number of contexts and is not limited to learning verbal material. Karl Lashley, in his classic paper on serial order, argued that the sequential responses that appear to be organized in a linear and flat fashion concealed an underlying hierarchical structure. This was then demonstrated in motor control by Rosenbaum et al. in 1983. Thus sequences can consist of sub-sequences and these can, in turn, consist of sub-sub-sequences. Hierarchical representations of sequences have an advantage over linear representations: They combine efficient local action at low hierarchical levels while maintaining the guidance of an overall structure. While the representation of a linear sequence is simple from a storage point of view, there can be potential problems during retrieval. For instance, if there is a break in the sequence chain, subsequent elements will become inaccessible. On the other hand, a hierarchical representation would have multiple levels of representation. A break in the link between lower-level nodes does not render any part of the sequence inaccessible, since the control nodes (chunk nodes) at the higher level would still be able to facilitate access to the lower-level nodes. 

Chunks in motor learning are identified by pauses between successive actions in Terrace (2001). It is also suggested that during the sequence performance stage (after learning), participants download list items as chunks during pauses. He also argued for an operational definition of chunks suggesting a distinction between the notions of input and output chunks from the ideas of short-term and long-term memory. Input chunks reflect the limitation of working memory during the encoding of new information (how new information is stored in long-term memory), and how it is retrieved during subsequent recall. Output chunks reflect the organization of over-learned motor programs that are generated on-line in working memory. Sakai et al. (2003) showed that participants spontaneously organize a sequence into a number of chunks across a few sets and that these chunks were distinct among participants tested on the same sequence. They also demonstrated that the performance of a shuffled sequence was poorer when the chunk patterns were disrupted than when the chunk patterns were preserved. Chunking patterns also seem to depend on the effectors used.

Perlman found in his series of experiments that tasks that are larger in size and broken down into smaller sections had faster respondents than the task as a large whole. The study suggests that chunking a larger task into a smaller more manageable task can produce a better outcome. The research also found that completing the task in a coherent order rather than swapping from one task to another can also produce a better outcome.

Chunking in seven-month-old infants 
Previous research shows that the mechanism of chunking is available in seven-month-old infants. This means that chunking can occur even before the working memory capacity has completely developed. Knowing that the working memory has a very limited capacity, it can be beneficial to utilize chunking. In infants, whose working memory capacity is not completely developed, it can be even more helpful to chunk memories. These studies were done using the violation-of-expectation method and recording the amount of time the infants watched the objects in front of them. Although the experiment showed that infants can use chunking, researchers also concluded that an infant's ability to chunk memories will continue to develop over the next year of their lives.

Chunking as the learning of long-term memory structures
This usage derives from Miller's (1956) idea of chunking as grouping, but the emphasis is now on long-term memory rather than only on short-term memory. A chunk can then be defined as "a collection of elements having strong associations with one another, but weak associations with elements within other chunks". Chase and Simon in 1973 and later Gobet, Retschitzki, and de Voogt in 2004 showed that chunking could explain several phenomena linked to expertise in chess. Following a brief exposure to pieces on a chessboard, skilled chess players were able to encode and recall much larger chunks than novice chess players. However, this effect is mediated by specific knowledge of the rules of chess; when pieces were distributed randomly (including scenarios that were not common or allowed in real games), the difference in chunk size between skilled and novice chess players was significantly reduced. Several successful computational models of learning and expertise have been developed using this idea, such as EPAM (Elementary Perceiver and Memorizer) and CHREST (Chunk Hierarchy and Retrieval Structures). Chunking has also been used with models of language acquisition. The use of chunk-based learning in language has been shown to be helpful. Understanding a group of basic words and then giving different categories of associated words to build on comprehension has shown to be an effective way to teach reading and language to children.

Chunking learning style and short-term memory 
Norris conducted a study in 2020 of chunking and short-term memory recollection and found that when a chunk is given it is stored a single item even though it is a relatively large amount of information. This finding suggests that chunks should be less susceptible to decay or interference when they are recalled. The study used visual stimuli where all the items were given simultaneously. Items of two and three were found to be recalled easier than singles, and more singles were recalled when in a group with threes.

See also

Chunking in language acquisition
Conceptual graph
Flow (psychology)
Forgetting curve
Generalization (learning)
Knowledge representation and reasoning
Memory
Memory Encoding
Merge (linguistics)
Method of loci
Mnemonic
Sequence learning

References

Further reading
 Baddeley, A. The Essential Handbook for Human Memory Disorders for Clinicians. 2004. John Wiley and Sons.
 Craik, F.I.M. and Lockhart, R.S. "Levels of Processing: A Framework for Memory Research." Journal of Verbal Learning and Verbal Behavior 11:671-684. 1972
 Chiarotti, F., Cutuli, D., Foti, F., Mandolesi, L., Menghini, D., Petrosini, L., & Vicari, S. (2011). Explorative function in Williams syndrome analyzed through a large-scale task with multiple rewards. Research in Developmental Disabilities, 32, 972-985. 
 Cohen, A., & Glicksohn, A.  (2011). The role of Gestalt grouping principles in visual statistical learning. Attention, Perception, & Psychophysics, 73, 708-713. 
 Gobet, F.; de Voogt, A.J.; & Retschitzki, J. (2004). Moves in mind: The psychology of board games. Hove, UK: Psychology Press.
 Gobet, F.; Lane, P.C.R.; Croker, S.; Cheng, P.C.H.; Jones, G.; Oliver, I.; & Pine, J.M. (2001). Chunking mechanisms in human learning. Trends in Cognitive Sciences, 5, 236-243. doi 10.1016/S1364-6613(00)01662-4
 Gabriel, R. F. Mayzner, M. S. (1963). Information "chunking" and short-term retention. Journal of Psychology: Interdisciplinary and Applied, 56, 161-164.  
 Bapi, R.S.; Pammi, V.S.C.; Miyapuram, K.P.; and Ahmed (2005). Investigation of sequence learning: A cognitive and computational neuroscience perspective. Current Science, 89:1690-1698.
 Maybery, M. et al. "Grouping of list items reflected in the timing of recall: implications for models of serial verbal memory." Journal of Memory and Language 47: 360-385. 30 October 2001.
 Reed, S. K. (2010). Cognition: Theories and application (8th ed.). Belmont, CA: Wadsworth Cengage Learning.
 Tulving, E. "Subjective Organization and Effects of Repetition in Multi-Trial Free-Recall Learning." Journal of Verbal Learning and Verbal Behavior, Volume 5. 1966

External links
 The Magical Number Seven, Plus or Minus Two: Full text of Miller's 1956 paper
 The Magical Number Seven, Plus or Minus Two: Alternate text of Miller's 1956 paper

Cognition
Mnemonics
Memory